The Soddo or Kistane (Gurage: ክስታኔ; endonym: Aymellel, Gordena) a subgroup of the Gurage who inhabit the south-central part of Ethiopia, considered the northern geographic and linguistic subset of the Gurage and speak the Soddo Gurage language or Kistanigna (ክስታንኛ). They primarily inhabit the Soddo (woreda) in the Gurage Zone, but large amounts also live in various parts of Ethiopia, particularly in Addis Abeba, Nazret, Butajira, and Dire Dawa. They are related to the Sebat Bet Gurage and other Gurage sub-groups, however, in contrast to the Sebat Bet Gurage and Silte, they are exclusively and almost entirely Ethiopian Orthodox Tewahedo Christians. The Soddo Gurage are known for and pride themselves on their Orthodox Christian identity, which they have historically practiced since ancient times, and from which their name Kistane (lit. Christian) derives its name from, as it is the traditional and preferred name by locals for the people, although Soddo is still popularly used.

The Soddo Gurage are related to their fellow Gurages, including the Dobi, who live south and are also referred to as "Kistane", as well as the Meskan and Muher. They also shared considerable geographic and linguistic polity with the Gafat, now an extinct group, and which was located adjacent to them, encompassing territory that once stretched widely to Gojjam and Kingdom of Damot in the west before the incursions of the Oromo migrations.

History 

The earliest reference to the Kistane dates back centuries. Historical sources list Aymellel (Alamale) as a district and province that was governed by Emperor Amda Seyon (1314–1344) in the early 14th century and served at times as a military garrison and settlement by him and future emperors. 19th and 20th-century academics and linguists used the term to identify the Kistane and is continued to be traditionally used by other Gurages in reference to them. However, in the present, "Aymellel" is preserved as being only one of the several sub-groups or Agers consisting of the Soddo Kistane, suggesting that the Aymellel once represented the historically dominant group amongst them before it lost its political significance. Some Kistane oral sources claim descendence from the north, in places such as Axum, Gojjam, Gonder, and Bulga. citing their long-standing links with the historical empire to antiquity.

Kistaneland (as the region is sometimes referred to as, is the site of numerous historical sites, such as the monolithic UNESCO World Heritage site Tiya and the similar Gereno staeles. It also contains several historical monasteries such as Medre Kebd Abo, and the monolithic church Adadi Mariam, a testament to the area's strong and long links with Christianity in the area. According to religious hagiography, St. Gebre Menfes Kidus built the Medre Kebd Abo monastery in the 11th century, later being buried there and in local tradition, it is said that the brother of Emperor Ezana of Axum, Saizana founded Adadi Mariam in 4th century, while some date back its construction to the 12th century under the reign of Lalibela (Emperor of Ethiopia) during the Zagwe dynasty. Both of these are major sites of Christian pilgrimage to thousands around the country today. The Orthodox Faith is an integral cornerstone for the peoples' societal structure, morals, culture, and ethnic identity.
 

That the Kistane's homeland once stretched much further wide is attested in the discoveries of remnants of a Kistane population in Lake Wonchi and the Ambo area known as the Galila when French Explorer Antoine d'Abbadie met with them in Gojjam returning to their home in Wonchi. The Priests identified themselves as Kistane (Christian) Gurages, stating they were led by their hereditary ruler Abegaz Wolle who were constantly at war with the Oromo. Ethnologist Eike Haberland visited the area in 1955 to further research the people who by that time had almost become extinct and were in danger of being assimilated. He also studied the ethnology of the Chebo, another related Gurage people who were already mostly assimilated by the Oromo but whose original name was Kurchase. He noted the Galila and Chebo both were the original inhabitants of the Dandiff mountains in Western Shewa but upon the Oromo migrations, both were forced to be confined in the foothill areas of the mountains and lake edge. Unlike the Chebo, the Galila lived in the higher mountains escarpments and were able to preserve their identity. Haberland agreed with linguist Wolf Leslaus hypothesis of the Kistane language being an extension of Gafat and denoted that the presence of the Galila sect of the Kistane in the area, as well as the Kurchase strengthened the argument that the Gurage and Gafat once shared adjacent territories much larger than the land they currently possess. This is further affirmed by Ulrich Braukamper's conclusion of the presence of the Kistane in Waj before the migration of the Hadiya people and the discoveries of Christian relics and artifacts in Mt. Chilalo and the Lake Langano massifs. 

During the 15th to 17th centuries, "Aymellel" was listed by some explorers such as Hiob Ludolf as an independent district separate from other Gurages, who were described by some as “Pagans”, while the Aymellel were Christians.  Later in 1841, several subgroups and polities belonging to Christian Gurages (i.e. Kistane) were listed by Ludwig Krapf:

"The Christians are settled in the following places:---1. Aimelelle ; 2. Nurreno; 3. Bezanchubu; 4. Manes; 5. Malakdamo; 6. Wogoram; 7. Buiyana; 8. Yudamo; 9. Dachi; 10. Yetanne; 11. Arechat; 12. Heberrer; 13. Arogomane; 14. Dobi; 15. Yawitwi; 16. Yatabona; 17. Zera Zangania; 18. Mohor."

Of these, the most notable belonging to the Sodo Kistane include Aimellele (Aymellel), Nurenno (Nurenna), Buiyana (Bui), Wogaram, and Malakdamo (Damu); while Dobi, Heberrer (Sheberrer), Arechat, Arogame (Argume) are Dobi, and Moher (Muher) are a subgroup of the Sebat Bet which, like the Kistane were Christian for centuries.

Oromo migrations/invasions and impact 
Sources list that the locals of Aymellel aided and fought in the armies of the Christian Kingdom in fighting against the invasion of Ahmad ibn Ibrahim al-Ghazi during the Ethiopian-Adal war in the 16th century and were subsequently attacked and ransacked; Midre Kebd Abo most notably was burned and its treasures were looted by Islamic forces. After the Imam's death in 1541 and the Christian Ethiopian state's narrow victory over them however, in the mid-16th century, the Gurage, like much of the rest of the inhabitants of southern Ethiopia found themselves victims of long-standing invasions, once more, this time from the Oromo. The Oromo migrations, which started somewhere from the south-eastern peripheries of the country near the Kenyan border, began a series of expansions and incursions north-wards which would profoundly permanently affect the demographics of central, western, and southern Ethiopia today. The Gurage, Amhara, Hadiya, and Sidama were the most successful groups to resist the newcomers. The geographic location of the Kistane however, left them more susceptible to Oromo raids and incursions in contrast to their fellow Gurages, and were not only separated from the mainland but were encircled and forced to endure centuries of aggressions and conflicts with them, as well as to a lesser extent, the Mareqo.  For a long period of time, despite initially being forced to concede much land, they were largely successful in repulsing and withstanding them, winning many series of battles. Many local heroes, known as Gotas such as Gacho Zage and Yadutu Dugda of Wacho, Bene Dutu of Aratge, Dama Roge of Damu, and many others continue to be hailed and oral stories of their bravery in battle are recited by elders. However, a reversal of fortune for them came around the early 19th century and the Oromo became even more aggressive, possibly due to the simultaneous expansions of the rulers of Shewa Amhara in the north at the same time that pushed them south, and with the aid of neighboring Oromo tribes of Becho, Gimbitchu and Liben became more successful in infiltrating almost all of the Kistane mainland.

“The Galla first broke into Aymallal territory through Ambare Wargo in Nuranna. Then other Aymallal areas, like Gayat, Gareno, Endabuya, Amawte, were invaded and sacked. The main Galla tribes that invaded Aymallal were the Abado and Malima from the north, both members of the Tulama branch of the Galla, the Geto, and the Dula. Amawte is said to have been invaded by the Abado, Wacho by the Geto, and Aratge by the Dula. Another, less known, tribe, the Jidda, invaded Gareno. Of these tribes, the one most feared was the Abado, with whom the Aymallal had most of their battles."

The overall effect of the Oromo invasion was one of despoliation, depopulation (through either death or flight), and enslavement. The traffic of Gurage slaves substantially increased in the mid-19th century. There are still elders who have memories of grandparents or other such relatives sold into slavery by the Oromo. The invasion and despoliation caused many Kistane villagers to flee and settle in neighbouring areas such as Ada, Meqi, Zway, Minjar, and Bulga, facilitating the first mass migrations of the Gurage in other parts of the country. Many Gurages had desperately appealed to Negus Sahle Selassie to protect them from Oromo attacks. Isenburg witnessed Gurage slaves begging at the feet of the King, attesting that when they go to Shewa they are often nearly naked as Oromos frequently ambush and rob them, and the King gifts them new clothes, knowing the raiders would fear angering the King. Many Oromo also peacefully intermarried with the Kistane, with many of the latter speaking the language of the former and adopting Oromo names as well as Amharic names. An example of this was the marriage between the renowned Oromo general Ras Gobana Dacche, who led Menelik's armies in his re-conquest over much of the south and western parts of Ethiopia, and his wife Askalech, a Kistane Gurage, who was also the grandmother of Arbegna and Prime Minister Ras Abebe Aregai. The mother of Haile Selassie, Yeshimibet Ali, was the daughter of the Wollo Oromo chief Aba Jiffar Gamcho and his Sodo Kistane Gurage wife Wolete-Giorgis, who later became a nun.  Many neighboring Oromo tribes were also converted to Orthodox Christianity by Kistane Gurage priests, and in addition to intermarrying and mixing with them, many adopted traditional Gurage customs and cultures. This is most present with the Jida and Abado clans of the Tulama branch, as well as the Geto who are mostly indistinguishable from them in customs or tradition.

Other links and Modern period 

The Kistane also share long historical and ancestral ties with the Amhara, particularly of Shewa who share the same Orthodox Christian religious faith, several customs, and speak similar languages. This is further augmented by the fact that they both belong to the South Ethio-Semitic language branch family and amongst the Gurage dialects and languages, the Kistane language is thought to be lexically closest to Amharic. Several clans of the Kistane are recorded to have been descended from Amharas who migrated to the area to escape Gragn's invasions and which are attested in their ancestral lineages (i.e. Fasilgè). King Sahle Selassie of Shewa, himself also drawn into conflict with the Oromo, responded to a request of the leader and famed military commander of the Kistane, Woda Leliso for military help and an alliance against the Oromo who were growing increasingly aggressive and sent bands of Amhara riflemen to aid them By 1830, he gained the submission of the Kistane leaders Kero and Amino and incorporated them as a tributary state of Shewa, monikering himself as "King of the Gurage". When Menelik II, his grandson sought to re-expand and conquer the rest of the southern parts of the country in the 1870s, the Kistane submitted peacefully once again. This allowed them to retain their local political autonomy and spared them from the depredations that other Gurage sub-groups and neighboring peoples who did rebel faced. They were able to live relatively more peacefully throughout the next few decades. However, several Oromo Baleabats (overlords) still ruled over Kistane Gurages in many districts in Kistaneland by force, and many emigrated to various parts of Ethiopia as a result of the despoliation and shrinking of their homeland which they were confined in that became unable to sustain their population. It was when Addis Abeba was founded when many Kistane Gurages emigrated to the newly founded Addis Abeba, becoming the first pioneers of the Gurages to establish themselves in the new capital and greatly contributed to the labor work and construction in it.  Shewan aristocratic and Kistane sources recite that Emperor Menelik granted the Kistane land in the district of Geja in Addis Abeba, being the first area where they historically settled and encouraged them to live there. The Alemgena-Welayta Road Construction association was founded by the Kistane during Haile Sellasie's and provided a source of labor, employment opportunities and communal identity for new young emigrants who migrated to Addis.

After the overthrow of Haile Selassie and the imperial regime in 1974, a communist regime under the Derg replaced it. Under the new marxist-inspired land system, many Gurage landowners had their land forcibly expropriated by the ruling regime and were further pushed to urban centres to accumulate their wealth. In 1991, after the overthrow of the Derg and the ascendance of the EPRDF, a new ethnic-based federalist system was introduced. Many Oromo politicians pushed for the Kistane Gurage to identify as Oromo and to join the Oromia region as opposed to the SNNPR region. When they refused, proponents of several Oromo-based political parties and movements such as the OLF (Oromo Liberation Front), IFLO (Islamic front for the liberation of the Oromo), and the OPDO intimidated, destroyed properties in the Sodo Kistane region and used violence to threaten communities who did not align with them. In response, proponents of the Kistane Gurage angrily countered and formed a separate coalition called the Soddo Gordena Democratic action.

Language 
 
The Soddo Gurage language, also known traditionally and locally as Kistanigna, is one of the Gurage languages from the Northern group, which is classified as one of the clusters of South Ethio-Semitic. Within the South Ethio-Semitic, it is branched under the Gunnangn Branch of Gurage languages. It is not mutually intelligible with any of the West Gurage or East Gurage languages (i.e. Sebat Bet). Kistanigna is generally considered closest to Amharic than the other Gurage languages. It shares a 76%/90% mutualistic comprehensibility with the closely related Dobi, as well as sharing considerable affinity with the Meskane language. It is also closely related to the now-extinct Gafat language, which was spoken in present-day Welega and Gojjam.

Communal laws and organization 
Unlike their neighbors to the north and much of the rest of the country, the Gurage traditionally did not practice a structured monarchial system and thus lacked definitive kings or single rulers. Instead, they politically organized in communal systems of governance that were governed by several local respective chiefs. The system of governance of the Soddo Kistane are known as Ye Gordena Sera which is also shared with the Gedebeno, while the Dobi practice the Ye Sinana Sera, and the Meskan  Ye Feresgena Sera. It comprises customary and legalistic laws, social/communal organization, and territorial units. The Gordena was thought to have been founded in a district called Enjeri in the Nurena area, and is often referred to interchangeably as that (i.e. Ye Enjeri Sera). It is in contrast with the Sebat Bet Gurage who practices the similar Yajoka Kicha. While the Yajoka Kicha spans its establishment to about 300 years, the Kistane shows remarkably consensus in tracing the establishment of the Gordena to over 600 years. Like the Sebat Bet, the Sodo Kistane is composed of several agnatic descent groups. However, unlike the Sebat Bet, these sub-groups are categorized based on geographic territory rather than genealogical lineages and clans. These subdivisions are known in the Kistane as Agers. Within each Ager are dozens of smaller territorial and familial units called Sebuggnets.

The circumstances that led to the uniting of these agers and the establishment of the Gordena were the presence of both internal and external threats; the long territorial disputes between the warring "agers", in addition to the external threat of the Mareko (and later the Oromo) facilitated the development of a united system to combat them. The Sera system is not limited to the Gurage however but is also shared with the Wolayta, Sidama, and Gamo people, who all practice similar forms of governance and political structures and who all consume and practice the Enset lifestyle culture.

Notable individuals 
-Teddy Afro, national artist and singer

-Aster Aweke, national artist and singer

-Abinet Agonafer, singer

-Abonesh Adinew, singer

-Minalush Reta, singer

-Argaw Bedaso, singer

-Dejazmach Balcha Safo, war commander, dejazmach, governor

-Dejazmach Gebremariam Gari, war commander, governor

-Dejazmach Geresu Duki. war commander

-Dejazmach Bekele Weya, war commander

-Getaneh Kebede, professional athlete

References

Ethiopian Orthodox Tewahedo Church
Ethnic groups in Ethiopia
Habesha peoples